Anax georgius is a species of large dragonfly of the family Aeshnidae, commonly known as the Kimberley emperor. 
It inhabits ponds 
in the Kimberley area of Western Australia

Anax georgius is a very large dragonfly with a green body and dark brown tail with pale markings.

Gallery

See also
 List of Odonata species of Australia

References

Aeshnidae
Odonata of Australia
Insects of Australia
Endemic fauna of Australia
Taxa named by Edmond de Sélys Longchamps
Insects described in 1872